This is a partial list of molecules that contain 17 carbon atoms.

See also
 Carbon number
 List of compounds with carbon number 16
 List of compounds with carbon number 18

C17